Senator Nutting may refer to:

John Nutting (politician) (born 1949), Maine State Senate
Leslie Nutting (born 1945), Wyoming State Senate